Saeed Kangarani (5 August 1954 – 14 September 2018), was an Iranian actor.   

He was a young actor during the pre-revolutionary Iranian cinema and didn't appear on the screens after the Iranian revolution until 2006 with the film, Marriage, Iranian Style. He died of heart attack on 14 September 2018.

Filmography
 2006 Marriage Iranian Style as Uncle Saeed
 1981 Bloody Season
 1981 Gerdab
 1980 Parvaz dar ghafas as Sohrab
 1978 The Cycle as Ali
 1978 Dar Emtedad-e Shab as Babak
 1976 My Uncle Napoleon (television series) as Saeed
 1976 The Custodian as Davood
 1970 Reza Motorcyclist

References

External links 
 

Iranian male film actors
Iranian male television actors
1954 births
2018 deaths
People from Tehran